Cemophora coccinea coccinea, commonly known as the Florida scarlet snake, is the nominotypical subspecies of the scarlet snake. It is a nonvenomous colubrid snake that is endemic to the southeastern United States.

Geographic range
It is found exclusively in peninsular Florida, from as far north as Marion County to the southern tip of the state.

Description 
It is typically gray or white, with red blotches bordered by black along its back. The black borders on the blotches often join on the lower sides of the snake forming a line down the length of the body. Its belly is a uniform white. Its scales are smooth.

Scarlet snakes can sometimes be mistaken for the scarlet kingsnake, (Lampropeltis triangulum elapsoides) or the Eastern milk snake (Lampropeltis triangulum triangulum) in the areas where their ranges overlap. The Florida scarlet snake can easily be distinguished from the scarlet kingsnake by its white (rather than yellow) bands, and from the Eastern milk snake by its red head and slightly upturned nose.

Distinguishing the Florida scarlet snake from the closely allied Northern scarlet snake is more difficult, although generally the subspecies can be identified based on location; the ranges of the two subspecies overlap only minimally. The main point of distinction is in the number of upper labial scales present in each subspecies: the Florida scarlet snake has 7 upper labial scales, while the Northern scarlet snake has 6.

Behavior 
Like other scarlet snakes, the Florida scarlet snake is a secretive, burrowing species, preferring habitats of soft soils, often in open forested areas or developed agricultural land. They spend most of their time hidden, emerging to feed on small rodents and lizards, but they have a particular taste for reptile eggs, swallowing them whole or puncturing them and consuming the contents.

Reproduction
Florida scarlet snakes are oviparous. Mating occurs in March through June, with 3-8 eggs laid in mid summer, and hatching in early fall.

References 

The Florida Museum of Natural History: Cemophora coccinea coccinea

Cemophora
Fauna of the Southeastern United States
Reptiles of the United States